School Daze is a 1988 American musical comedy-drama film, written and directed by  Spike Lee, and starring Laurence Fishburne (credited as Larry Fishburne), Giancarlo Esposito, and Tisha Campbell.  Based in part on Spike Lee's experiences as a Morehouse student in the Atlanta University Center during the 1970s, it is a story about undergraduates in a fraternity and sorority clashing with some of their classmates at a historically black college during homecoming weekend. It also touches upon issues of colorism, elitism, classism, political activism, hazing, groupthink, female self-esteem, social mobility, and hair texture bias within the African-American community. The second feature film by Spike Lee, School Daze was released on February 12, 1988 by Columbia Pictures.

Plot
Vaughn “Dap” Dunlap is a politically and socially conscious black student at Mission College, a leading historically black college in Atlanta. On homecoming weekend, Dap leads an anti-apartheid demonstration, demanding that the school divest from South Africa, and feuds with Julian “Dean Big Brother Almighty” Eaves, the head/president of Mission College's Gamma Phi Gamma Fraternity chapter.  Dap's younger cousin Darrell “Half-Pint”, a Gamma pledge, is ordered by Julian to bring a girl to the fraternity that night, and goes to Dap for advice.

Cedar Cloud, chairman of Mission's board of trustees, warns college president Harold McPherson that the divestment protests may scare off the school's wealthy donors. The Gamma Rays, the Gamma women's auxiliary led by Julian's girlfriend Jane Toussaint – mostly light-skinned black women with straightened hair – clash with some of their non-Greek classmates, including Dap's girlfriend Rachel Meadows – mostly dark-skinned black women with natural hair – over skin color and hair politics. Unsuccessful in courting any female students, Darrell and the pledges are hazed. Dap and Rachel have a falling out when she plans to rush a sorority, and she accuses him of colorism.

The weekend's festivities begin, and the Gamma brothers nearly come to blows with Dap and his fellow protestors at the homecoming parade. After the Mission football team suffers an embarrassing loss, Cloud and McPherson threaten Dap with expulsion if he continues his activism. Dap and his friends drive into town to eat at KFC, where they are harassed by locals who resent them as privileged college boys. Returning to campus, Dap confronts Julian about Darrell's pledge status. At the Greeks’ step show, a performance by Dap and his friends leads to a brawl with the Gammas. Seeking out Rachel, Dap is humiliated by her dorm neighbors, but he and Rachel reconcile.

Darrell and the Gamma pledges endure a grueling initiation and are welcomed as new members. At the school dance, Dap's roommate Grady hits it off with a female student and coaxes her to his room, but she refuses to stay when Dap and Rachel are already there. As the Gammas celebrate, Julian forces Jane to have sex with Darrell, but rejects her afterward. Darrell excitedly informs Dap, who is infuriated. At sunrise, Dap wakes the entire campus from the previous night's debauchery. A tearful Julian arrives and stands eye-to-eye with Dap, who breaks the fourth wall to tell the audience directly, “Please, wake up”.

Cast

Themes
School Daze explores several issues within the Black-American community such as colorism, elitism, classism, political activism, hazing, groupthink, female self-esteem, social mobility, and hair texture bias—all against the backdrop of an historically black college. Daphnee McMaster of The Spool asserts that in setting the film at an HBCU director Spike Lee peers into a very particular black space largely isolated from the rest of American society: "every conversation is directly related to black people’s own perceptions of, and issues amongst, themselves".

Class divisions 
Two major themes found in the film are the issues of skin color-based class divisions and economic inequality. The divide between light-skinned people and dark-skinned people is exemplified by the rivalry between the Gamma Phi Gamma fraternity and its coed counterpart—which are predominantly made up of affluent, light-skinned students and Dap's politically conscious friends and the Pi Delta Pi sorority—which is predominantly made up of dark-skinned students from lower-class backgrounds. Throughout the film, the characters from both groups engage in a series of confrontations and conflicts, fueled by their respective feelings of superiority and resentment towards one another. Another theme tied to this is the exploration of economic inequality through the character of Dap, a socially conscious and politically active student who is involved in a campaign to increase the number of black faculty members at Mission College. Dap's activism and commitment to social justice are juxtaposed with the apathy and materialism of other students, such as Julian, the wealthy and privileged president of the Gamma Phi Gamma fraternity.

Production
Production began on March 9, 1987 and ended on May 4, 1987. Spike Lee arranged for the two groups of actors to stay in separate hotels during filming. The actors playing the "wannabees" were given better accommodations than the ones playing the "jigaboos." This favoritism contributed to tension on the set, which showed in the on-camera animosity between the two camps. (Similar tactics were used during the filming of Animal House and The Outsiders.) In School Daze, the method approach yielded strong results — the fight that occurs at the step show between Dap's crew and the Gammas was not in the script. On the day the scene was shot, the fight broke out between the two sides. Lee ordered the cameras to keep rolling.

Officials of Morehouse, Spelman, and Clark Atlanta University asked Lee to stop filming on the campuses before he completed his work because the colleges' Boards of Directors had concerns on how he was portraying the historically black colleges in the film. Lee had to finish filming at the neighboring Morris Brown College.

Ruth E. Carter designed the costumes for the film, inspired by uniforms and styles worn at the HBCUs. At Lee's encouragement, she commissioned American fashion designer Willi Smith to design the gowns for the Homecoming Court in the film.

Reception
The film received mixed reviews for its exploration of issues within the black community. Roger Ebert of the Chicago Sun-Times noted, "There is no doubt in my mind that 'School Daze,' in its own way, is one of the most honest and revealing movies I've ever seen about modern middle-class black life in America." He also noted its frank exploration of issues of discrimination within the black community related to skin tone and nature of hair. He said it was significant as a film with a "completely black orientation. All of the characters, good and bad, are black, and all of the character's references are to each other."

On review aggregator website Rotten Tomatoes, the film holds an approval rating of 57%, based on 28 reviews, and an average rating of 5.9/10. The critical consensus reads: "School Daze is undeniably messy, but thought-provoking themes, strong performances, and Spike Lee's ingratiating energy help tie it all together."

Legacy
Kadeem Hardison, Darryl M. Bell and Jasmine Guy were principal cast members on The Cosby Show spin-off, A Different World — a TV series about life at a historically black college. (The NBC sitcom was airing its first season at the time of the film's release.) Other School Daze cast members also appeared on A Different World, including Dominic Hoffman, Tisha Campbell, Art Evans, Guy Killum and Roger Guenveur Smith.

In 2008, Alicia Keys paid homage to School Daze in the music video for her song "Teenage Love Affair". She imitated scenes including the rally in front of the school building, the pajama party, and the scene where Tisha Campbell and her court perform at coronation.

Soundtrack

"Da Butt," written by Marcus Miller and Mark Stevens, and performed by the group E.U. (who appear in the film), hit number 1 on Billboard's R&B chart and number 35 on its Pop chart. The School Daze soundtrack also features the song, "Be One," written by Bill Lee and performed by Phyllis Hyman, who also appears in the film.

See also
 Historically black colleges and universities
 List of African-American fraternities
Brown Paper Bag Test
 Colorism
 Stepping
 Burning Sands (2017)

References

External links

1988 films
1988 independent films
1980s musical comedy-drama films
American coming-of-age comedy-drama films
American musical comedy-drama films
African-American films
Films directed by Spike Lee
Films about race and ethnicity
American independent films
African-American musical films
Discrimination based on skin color
Columbia Pictures films
40 Acres and a Mule Filmworks films
Films about fraternities and sororities
Films shot in Atlanta
Films with screenplays by Spike Lee
African-American comedy films
African-American drama films
1988 comedy films
1988 drama films
1980s English-language films
1980s American films